Siddhesh Neral (born 3 June 1994) is an Indian cricketer. He made his first-class debut for Vidarbha in the 2017–18 Ranji Trophy on 14 October 2017. He made his Twenty20 debut on 8 November 2021, for Vidarbha in the 2021–22 Syed Mushtaq Ali Trophy.

References

External links
 

1994 births
Living people
Indian cricketers
Place of birth missing (living people)
Vidarbha cricketers